Lynyrd Skynyrd is the first box set by American rock band Lynyrd Skynyrd. It features outtakes, demos and live versions of songs from their first six albums. It was certified gold by the RIAA in November 1997.

Track listing

Disc 1 (1970–1973) 
"Free Bird" (Edited Demo, Oct 1970) (Allen Collins, Ronnie Van Zant) – 4:07
"Junkie" (Demo, Oct 1970) (Collins, Van Zant) – 3:48
"He's Alive" (Demo, Oct 1970) (Collins, Van Zant) – 3:09
"One More Time" (Original version, 1971) (Gary Rossington, Van Zant) – 5:02
"Gimme Three Steps" (Original version, 1971) (Collins, Van Zant) – 4:08
"Trust" (Original version, 1971) (Collins, Van Zant) – 4:12
"Comin' Home" (1971) (Collins, Van Zant)– 5:29
"Mr. Banker" (Demo, early 1973)" (Ed King, Rossington, Van Zant) – 5:18
"Down South Jukin (Demo, early 1973) (Rossington, Van Zant) – 2:53
"Truck Drivin' Man" (Demo, early 1973) (King, Van Zant) – 5:15
"I Ain't the One" (Demo, early 1973) (Rossington, Van Zant) – 3:46
"Poison Whiskey" (Demo. early 1973) (King, Van Zant) – 3:08
"Tuesday's Gone" (Collins, Van Zant) – 7:32
"Things Goin' On" (Rossington, Van Zant) – 4:58
"Free Bird" (Collins, Van Zant) – 9:09

Disc 2 (1974–1976) 
"Sweet Home Alabama" (King, Rossington, Van Zant) – 4:43
"Was I Right or Wrong?" (recorded Jan 1974) (previously unreleased) (Rossington, Van Zant) – 5:08
"Workin' for MCA" (King, Van Zant) – 4:46
"Don't Ask Me No Questions" (Rossington, Van Zant) – 3:24
"Swamp Music" (King, Van Zant) – 3:31
"The Ballad of Curtis Loew" (Collins, Van Zant) – 4:50
"The Needle and the Spoon" (Collins, Van Zant) – 3:52
"Call Me the Breeze" (J.J. Cale) – 5:06
"Saturday Night Special" (King, Van Zant) – 5:08
"Made in the Shade" (Van Zant) – 4:39
"Am I Losin'?" (Rossington, Van Zant) – 4:33
"On the Hunt" (Collins, Van Zant) – 5:26
"(I Got the) Same Old Blues" (Cale) – 4:07
"Double Trouble" (Live) (Collins, Van Zant) – 3:03
"Roll Gypsy Roll" (Collins, Rossington, Van Zant) – 2:49
"All I Can Do Is Write About It" (Acoustic version) (recorded November 28, 1975) (previously unreleased) (Collins, Van Zant) – 4:20
"Four Walls of Raiford" (undubbed demo) (recorded Apr 1976) (Carlisi, Van Zant) – 4:12

Disc 3 (1976–1977) 
"Gimme Back My Bullets" (Live) (Rossington, Van Zant) – 3:37
"Searchin (Live) (Collins, Van Zant) – 4:00
"Simple Man" (Live) (Rossington, Van Zant) – 6:48
"Crossroads" (Live) (Robert Johnson) – 4:17
"T for Texas (Blue Yodel #1)" (Live) (Jimmie Rodgers) – 8:42
"Whiskey Rock-A-Roller" (Live) (King, Billy Powell, Van Zant) – 4:16
"Ain't No Good Life" (Steve Gaines) – 4:38
"What's Your Name?" (Alternate mix) (Rossington, Van Zant) – 3:38
"Georgia Peaches" (Gaines, Van Zant) – 3:12
"What's Your Name?" (Rossington, Van Zant) – 3:31
"I Never Dreamed" (Gaines, Van Zant) – 5:19
"I Know a Little" (Gaines) – 3:26
"Honky Tonk Night Time Man" (Merle Haggard) – 4:02
"That Smell" (Collins, Van Zant) – 5:47
"You Got That Right" (Gaines, Van Zant) – 3:45

Disc 1, track 7 from Skynyrd's First and... Last (1978)
Disc 1, tracks 8 and 10 and disc 3, tracks 3 and 9 from Legend (1987)
Disc 1, tracks 13-15 from (Pronounced 'Lĕh-'nérd 'Skin-'nérd) (1973)
Disc 2, tracks 1 and 3-8 from Second Helping (1974)
Disc 2, tracks 9-12 from Nuthin' Fancy (1975)
Disc 2, tracks 13 and 15 from Gimme Back My Bullets (1976)
Disc 3, tracks 2 and 4-5 from One More from the Road (1976)
Disc 3, tracks 7 and 10-15 from Street Survivors (1977)
All other songs are previously unreleased (1991)

Live songs 
Disc 2, track 14 recorded 11/4/1975 at the Capitol Theatre in Cardiff, Wales
Disc 3, tracks 1 and 5 recorded 7/8/1976 at the Fox Theatre in Atlanta, Georgia, U.S.
Disc 3, tracks 2 and 4 recorded 7/9/1976 at the Fox Theatre in Atlanta, Georgia, U.S.
Disc 3, track 3 recorded 7/7/1976 at the Fox Theatre in Atlanta, Georgia, U.S.
Disc 3, track 6 recorded 8/21/1976 at the Knebworth Festival in Hertfordshire, England

Personnel
Taken from MCA Records 1991 CD box set release MCAD3-10390 liner notes

Lynyrd Skynyrd 1

Disc 1, Tracks 1-3

Ronnie Van Zant - vocals (7, overdubbed 1975)
Allen Collins - guitars
Gary Rossington - guitars
Larry Junstrom - bass
Bob Burns - drums

Lynyrd Skynyrd 2

Disc 1, Tracks 4-7

Ronnie Van Zant - vocals
Allen Collins - guitars
Gary Rossington - guitars

Additional Musicians
Greg Walker - bass (4,7)
Leon Wilkeson - bass (5,6)
Ricky Medlocke - drums, background vocals (4,7)
Bob Burns - drums (5,6)
Billy Powell - piano (7, overdubbed 1975)
Ed King - guitar (7, overdubbed 1975)
Tim Smith - background vocals (4)

Lynyrd Skynyrd 3

Disc 1, Tracks 8-15

Ronnie Van Zant - vocals
Allen Collins - guitars (except 8)
Gary Rossington - guitars
Ed Kings - bass (all tracks except 8 & 13), guitar (8)
Bob Burns - drums (except 8 & 13)
Billy Powell - piano (except 8)

Additional Musicians
Roosevelt Gook (Al Kooper) - bass (13), mellotron (13), backup harmony (13), organ (14)
Robert Nix - drum (13)
Bobbye Hall - percussion (14)

Lynyrd Skynyrd 4

Disc 2, Tracks 1-9

Ronnie Van Zant - vocals (all tracks), background vocals (4)
Allen Collins - guitars (except 8)
Gary Rossington - guitars
Ed Kings - guitars
Billy Powell - keyboards
Leon Wilkeson - bass (all tracks), background vocals (3-5,8,9)
Bob Burns - drums

Additional Musicians
Background vocals Clydie King, Merry Clayton, & Friends - background vocals (1)
Al Kooper - piano (4,6), horn arrangement (4,8), acoustic guitar (6), background vocal (6), moog synthesizers (9)
Horns Bobby Keys, Trevor Lawrence, Steve Madiao - horns (4,8)
Handclapping by Wicker, Toby Cockroad, Moochie, Punnel, Wolfman, Kooder, Mr. Feeback, and Gooshie (8)

Lynyrd Skynyrd 5

Disc 2, Tracks 10-12

Ronnie Van Zant - vocals (all tracks), background vocals (1)
Allen Collins - guitars
Gary Rossington - guitars
Ed Kings - guitars (all tracks), background vocals (1)
Billy Powell - keyboards (all tracks), piano (1)
Leon Wilkeson - bass
Artimus Pyle - drums, percussion

Additional Musicians
Al Kooper - background vocals (1,2)
David Foster - piano (1)

Lynyrd Skynyrd 6

Disc 2, Tracks 13-17

Ronnie Van Zant - vocals, guitar (17)
Allen Collins - guitars
Gary Rossington - guitars
Leon Wilkeson - bass
Billy Powell - keyboards
Artimus Pyle - drums, percussion

Additional Muscians
Jeff Carlisi - guitar (17)

Lynyrd Skynyrd 7

Disc 3 (all tracks)

Ronnie Van Zant - vocals, guitar (17)
Allen Collins - guitars
Gary Rossington - guitars (all tracks), overdubs (9)
Steve Gaines - guitars (all tracks), lead vocals (7), vocals (15)
Leon Wilkeson - bass (all tracks), overdubs (9)
Billy Powell - keyboards (all tracks), overdubs (9)
Artimus Pyle - drums, percussion

Additional Musicians
"The Honkettes" (Cassie Gaines, JoJo Billingsley, Leslie Hawkins - backup vocals (6,14)

Certifications

References 

Albums produced by Tom Dowd
Lynyrd Skynyrd compilation albums
1991 compilation albums
MCA Records compilation albums